Majk Spirit (born Michal Dušička; 28 August 1984) is a Slovak rapper and member of the group H16, named after his primary school Hálova 16 in Petržalka.

The winner of the MTV Europe Music Awards for the Best Czech and Slovak Act category in 2012, released his debut album Nový človek in 2011, earning also the Best New Artist award at 2011's Slávik annual music poll. His manager is Michal Matejovic.

Discography 
Studio albums
 2011: Nový človek (New Person)
 2015: Y (Black/White)
 2018: Nie som tu náhodou
 2020: Artist (Artist)

with H16
 2006: Kvalitný materiál (Quality material)
 2008: Čísla nepustia(Numbers don't let go)
 2013: Rýmy, Hudba a Boh (Rhymes, Music and God)
 2016: Sila (Power)
 2021: Lockdown Music (Lockdown Music)

See also 
 "Ja a ty"(Me and you) – a 2012 song recorded with Celeste Buckingham
 "I Was Wrong" – a 2013 song recorded with Buckingham

References

External links 

 
 
 Majk Spirit on Discogs
 

Living people
Musicians from Bratislava
Slovak rappers
1984 births
MTV Europe Music Award winners